Panamanthus is a monotypic genus of flowering plants belonging to the family Loranthaceae. The only species is Panamanthus panamensis.

Its native range is Costa Rica to Panama.

References

Loranthaceae
Loranthaceae genera
Monotypic Santalales genera